Paavo Kuosmanen (born 14 October 1975) is a Finnish curler and curling coach.

At the international level, he is a  silver medallist.

At the national level, he is a four-time Finnish men's champion curler and three-time Finnish mixed champion curler.

Teams

Mixed

Mixed doubles

Record as a coach of national teams

References

External links

Living people
1975 births
Finnish male curlers
Finnish curling champions
Finnish curling coaches
Place of birth missing (living people)
21st-century Finnish people